Stefi Luxton (born 29 September 1991) is a snowboarder from New Zealand.

Born in Auckland, she competed for New Zealand at the 2014 Winter Olympics in Sochi.

References

External links
 Fis-Ski.com – Biography

1991 births
Living people
New Zealand female snowboarders
Snowboarders at the 2014 Winter Olympics
Olympic snowboarders of New Zealand
Sportspeople from Auckland